Morašice is a municipality and village in Svitavy District in the Pardubice Region of the Czech Republic. It has about 700 inhabitants.

Administrative parts
Villages of Lažany, Řikovice and Višňáry are administrative parts of Morašice.

References

Villages in Svitavy District